Born to Be Blue is an album by American jazz guitarist Grant Green featuring performances recorded in 1962 but not released until 1985 on the Blue Note label. Green is accompanied by tenor saxophonist Ike Quebec, pianist Sonny Clark, bassist Sam Jones and drummer Louis Hayes.

Reception

The Allmusic review by Alex Henderson awarded the album 4½ stars and stated "Although Grant Green provided his share of groove-oriented soul-jazz and modal post-bop, his roots were hard bop, and it is in a bop-oriented setting that the guitarist excels on Born to Be Blue".

Track listing

Recorded at Rudy Van Gelder Studio, Englewood Cliffs, NJ on March 1, 1962 except "Count Every Star", which was recorded at Rudy Van Gelder Studio on December 23, 1961.

Personnel
Grant Green – guitar
Ike Quebec – tenor saxophone
Sonny Clark – piano
Sam Jones – bass
Louis Hayes – drums

References 

Grant Green albums
1962 albums
Blue Note Records albums
Albums produced by Alfred Lion
Albums recorded at Van Gelder Studio